The year 2004 was declared the International Year of Rice by the United Nations, noting that rice is a staple food for more than half the world's population, and affirming the need to heighten awareness of the role of rice in alleviating poverty and malnutrition.

This is one of many International observances declared for specific days, months and years.  The year 2008 was declared the International Year of the Potato.

References

External links
International Year of Rice website

Rice, International Year of
Rice
2004 in international relations